Jahangir or Jangir ('Conqueror of the world') is a Persian male given name. Jahan means world or universe, while Gir means conqueror. In the Turkish language, its form is Cihangir. In many English speaking countries, Jahangir can also be spelled as Zhangir or Jangear.

People with the name 
Jahangir, 4th Mughal emperor of India
Jahangir I and Jahangir II, Paduspanid rulers
Jahangir III, Paduspanid ruler
Jahangir IV, Paduspanid ruler
Cihangir Ghaffari, Iranian actor
Jahangir Hasanzade, Azerbaijani footballer
Jahangir Khan, khan of the Kazakh Khanate
Jahangir Khan, Pakistani former squash player
Jahangir Khan (cricketer), Indian cricketer
Jahangir Khoja, Uyghur rebel against Qing rule in Kashgar
Jahangir Mirza, Dughlat prince and ruler of Yarkand
Jahangir Mirza (Timurid prince), a son of Timur
Mirza Jahangir Khan, Iranian writer, intellectual, and revolutionary
Jahangir (Aq Qoyunlu), Aq Qoyunlu ruler
Jahangir Tafazzoli (1914–1991), Iranian politician

Fictional characters
 Jahangeer, a recurring character in Corner Shop Show British web series

See also

 Jahangir (surname), list of people with the surname
 Cihangir (disambiguation)

References 

Indian masculine given names
Pakistani masculine given names
Persian masculine given names